is a Japanese football player and he is the currently first-team coach of Japan Football League club Okinawa SV..

Playing career
Takayanagi joined Okinawa SV in February 2019.

Club statistics
Updated to 23 February 2018.

References

External links

Profile at Renofa Yamaguchi FC 

1986 births
Living people
Association football people from Kanagawa Prefecture
Japanese footballers
J1 League players
J2 League players
Sanfrecce Hiroshima players
Hokkaido Consadole Sapporo players
Vissel Kobe players
Roasso Kumamoto players
Renofa Yamaguchi FC players
Okinawa SV players
Association football midfielders